Pius Adome is a Ugandan sprinter who competed at the 2018 Commonwealth Games. Adome competed in the men's 100 m and men's 200 m sprint events. Adome's 100 m heat consisted of seven runners including Cejhae Greene and Warren Fraser, Adome finished in 5th place with a time of 10.70 seconds finishing ahead of Kolinio Radrudru and Tirioro Willie. Adome's 200 metre heat consisted of eight athletes including silver medalist Aaron Brown. Adome ran the race finishing in 4th place with a time of 21.39 seconds.

On the May 11, 2019 in Kampala, Adome set a new national record in the 100 metre event with a time of 10.43 seconds.

References

1993 births
Living people
Commonwealth Games competitors for Uganda
Athletes (track and field) at the 2018 Commonwealth Games
Ugandan male sprinters
Athletes (track and field) at the 2019 African Games
African Games competitors for Uganda
People from Tororo District